The 1923–24 season was Arsenal's fifth consecutive season in the top division of English football.

Results
Arsenal's score comes first

Legend

Football League First Division

FA Cup

Arsenal entered the FA Cup in the first round proper, in which they were drawn to face West Ham United.

London FA Challenge Cup

See also

 1923–24 in English football
 List of Arsenal F.C. seasons

References

English football clubs 1923–24 season
1923-24